Aeschynomene elegans is a species of flowering plants in the family Fabaceae. It is found in Central and South America.

References

External links 

Dalbergieae
Plants described in 1830